This is a list of incidents of civil unrest in France. Civil unrest can include, rioting, strikes, violent labor disputes, or minor insurrections.

13th century
 1229: University of Paris strike of 1229, riots at the University of Paris that resulted in a number of student deaths and reforms of the medieval university.
 1251: Shepherds' Crusade, attacks on monasteries, universities and Jews.
 1257: Revolt in Marseille
 1261: Revolt in Marseille
 1270: Tax revolt in Cahors
 1274: Revolt in Limoges
 1276: Revolt in Limoges
 1281: Revolt in Rouen
 1292: Tax revolt in Rouen

14th century
 1307: Revolt in Paris
 1309: Crusade of the Poor in northern Europe and notably Picardy, Avignon and Marseille
 1320: Shepherds' Crusade, widespread violence in France and Aragon
 1338: Peasant revolt near Laon
 1347: Tax revolt in Rouen
 1351: Tax revolt in Rouen
 1358: Jacquerie peasant revolt in northern France
 1364: Peasant revolt near Toulouse
 1378–1384: Tuchin revolt in southern France
 1378–1382: Tax revolts across France, including the Harelle and Maillotins uprisings in Rouen and Paris

15th century
 1407–1435: Armagnac–Burgundian Civil War
 1413: Cabochien revolt in Paris
 1418: Revolt in Châlons-en-Champagne
 1440: Praguerie, a noble rebellion
 1465: League of the Public Weal, a noble rebellion
 1485–1488: Mad War, a noble rebellion

16th century
 1505: Riot in Nîmes
 1506: Riot in Carcassonne
 1507: Riot in Nevers
 1514: Tax revolt in Agen
 1516: Riot in Laval
 1519: Revolt in Libourne
 1521: Peasant revolt in Lantriac and Velay
 1521: Grain riots in Aix, Marseille and Tarascon
 1522: Revolt in Meaux
 1522: Grain riots in Beauvais and Tours
 1523: Revolt of Captain Montélon in Ile-de-France
 1525: Riots in Romans
 1526: Riots in Dijon
 1526–1527: Peasant riots in Sarladais
 1528: Wine tax revolt in Bordeaux
 1529:  in Lyon, riots in Dijon and Troyes
 1535: Riot in Foix
 1536: Peasant revolt in Provence, tax riot in Le Puy
 1537: Fighting between gendarmerie and commons in Albi
 1539: Gabelle salt tax revolt in Bordeaux, tax riot in Vermandois
 1539–1542: Strikes over printers' wages in Lyon and Paris
 1542: Gabelle revolt in La Rochelle, riots in Rouen and Tours
 1544: Revolt over taxes and religion in Saint-Maixent
 1545: Tax revolts and riots in Niort, Saintes, Périgueux, St Foy, Duras, Rouen and Comminges
 1545: Mérindol massacre
 1545–1546: Religious agitation across France
 1545–1547: Riots in Vitry over real estate speculation
 1548–1549: Revolt of the Pitauds in south-west France
 1552: Revolt in Nay
 1553: Riots in Le Puy
 1554: Peasant revolt in Normandy
 1560: Amboise Conspiracy, a failed attempt by Protestant nobles and ministers to seize the King.
 1560: Maligny Affair: an abortive Protestant uprising in the city of Lyon, backed by nobles and ministers including John Calvin.
 1561: Saint Médard Riot, a violent religious action in Paris that saw a church seized and more than ten killed.
 1562–1598: French Wars of Religion
 1562: 1562 Riots of Toulouse, a series of events that pitted members of the Reformed Church of France (often called Huguenots) against members of the Roman Catholic Church in violent clashes that ended with the deaths of between 3,000–5,000 citizens of the French city of Toulouse.
 1572: St. Bartholomew's Day massacre.
 1588: Day of the barricades, an uprising by the radical Catholics against the more moderate  Henry III.
 1593–1595: Croquant rebellions in south-west France

17th century
 1620: Battle of Ponts-de-Cé, a rebellion by Marie de' Medici is defeated by King Louis XIII.
 1620–1629: The Huguenot rebellions, a series of southern revolts in part led by Henri, Duke of Rohan in response to increasing reversals of the Edict of Nantes.
 1624: Peasant rebellion in Quercy
 1632: Battle of Castelnaudary, a rebellion by Gaston, Duke of Orléans is defeated by royal forces.
 1635–1637: Croquant rebellions in south-west France
 1638–1642: Croquant rebellions in south-west France
 1639: Revolt of the va-nu-pieds, a rebellion in Normandy
 1643: Croquant rebellions in Rouergue
 1645: Tax revolt in Montpellier
 1648–1653: The Fronde, a wave of revolts against the young Louis XIV.
 1650: Croquant rebellions in Limousin
 1655–1657: Tardanizat rebellion in Guyenne
 1658: Sabotiers rebellion in Sologne
 1661–1662: Benauge rebellion in Guyenne
 1662:  in Boulonnais
 1663–1665: Audijos rebellion
 1667–1668: Angelet revolt in Roussillon
 1670: Vivarais revolt
 1670–1674: Angelet revolt in Roussillon
 1675: Revolt of the papier timbré, a rebellion in Brittany
 1693–1694: Food riots during the 
 1698: Food riots

18th century

 1702–1710: Camisard Rebellion, a prolonged local guerrilla war by Protestants of the Cévennes region in the wake of the revocation of the Edict of Nantes by Louis XIV.
 1707: Croquant rebellions in Quercy
 1709–1710: Food riots during the famine of 1709–1710
 1718–1720: Pontcallec conspiracy, a rebellion in Brittany
 1725: Food riot in Paris
 1739–1740: Food riots
 1749: Food riots
 1752: Food riots
 1768: Food riots
 1770: Food riots
 1775: Flour War, a wave of riots in April to May 1775, that followed an increase in grain and bread prices, because police withheld grain from the royal stores in addition to poor harvests.
 1785: Food riots
 1786:  in Lyon
 1788: Day of the Tiles in Grenoble
 1789–1799: French Revolution, a revolution that overthrew the monarchy, established a republic, experienced violent periods of political turmoil, and finally culminated in a dictatorship by Napoleon that forcibly brought many of its ideals to Western Europe.

19th century
 1811–1812: Food riots
 1816–1817: Food riots
 1829–1830: Food riots
 1830: The July Revolution, which led to the abdication of Charles X and establishment of the July Monarchy under Louis Philippe I.
 1831: Canut revolt in Lyon, violent demonstrations in Paris and other cities
 1832: The June Rebellion, an anti-monarchist insurrection of Parisian republicans on 5 and 6 June 1832. Legitimist insurrections and protests in the west and south. Food riots in the east and southwest.
 1834: Canut revolt in Lyon
 1839: Coup attempt in Paris led by Louis Auguste Blanqui, Armand Barbès, Martin Bernard, and the Société des Saisons.
 1839–1840: Food riots
 1840: Strikes in Paris
 1841: Tax revolt in south-west France
 1845: Wool worker strikes in Lodève
 1846–1847: Food riots around Paris
 1848: French Revolution of 1848, street fighting in Paris resulting in the overthrow of the July Monarchy and proclamation of the French Second Republic.
 1848: French demonstration of 15 May 1848, an event played out in the streets of Paris that was intended to reverse the results of a Second Republic election of deputies to the Constituent Assembly.
 1848: The June Days uprising, an insurrection staged by Radical Republicans dissatisfied by the lack of social and class reform under the Second Republic.
 1849: Insurrections in Paris and Lyon
 1851: 1851 French coup d'état
 1853–1854: Food riots
 1868: Food riots
 1869: Violent strikes in 
 1871: Paris Commune, a radical socialist and revolutionary government that took power in the aftermath of the Franco-Prussian War and ruled Paris from 18 March to 28 May 1871.
 1880: Violent strikes
 1891–1894: Violent strikes and anarchist terrorism
 1893: Massacre of Italians at Aigues-Mortes

20th century
 1900–1901: Violent strikes in Belfort and Marseille
 1906–1907: Violent strikes
 1907: Revolt of the Languedoc winegrowers
 1908: Strikes in Nantes
 1910–1911: Champagne Riots, resulted from a series of problems faced by grape growers in the Champagne area of France.
 1919–1920: Violent strikes
 1921: Violence that broke out at the premiere of the play The Gas Heart.
 1926: Bloody Sunday, political clashes that occurred in Colmar, Alsace on August 22, 1926.
 1934: 6 February 1934 crisis, an anti-parliamentarist street demonstration in Paris organized by far-right leagues that culminated in a riot
 1936: General strike by one million workers
 1947: 1947 strikes in France, a series of insurrectional strikes
 1958: May 1958 crisis in France
 1961: Algiers putsch of 1961
 1968: May 1968 events in France, a volatile period of civil unrest that was punctuated by demonstrations and massive general strikes as well as the occupation of universities and factories across France.
 1979: Youths of North African origin rioted in the Lyon suburb of Vaulx-en-Velin following an arrest of a local youth. Believed to be the first suburban riot in French history.
 1981: Rodéo (riot), riots that consisted of stealing cars, driving them in tight circles, and ultimately burning them.
 1990: Rioting in Vaulx-en-Velin after a young man of Spanish origin was killed in a motorbike crash allegedly caused by police.
 1991: Violence broke out in Sartrouville after the fatal shooting of an Arab teenager by a supermarket security guard.
 1991: Rioting occurred in Mantes-la-Jolie after a policewoman and an Algerian man were killed.
 1992: Following the death of 18-year-old Mohamed Bahri in Vaulx-en-Velin at the hands of police, youths attacked the town's police station and burned cars.
 1995: Rioting in several eastern suburbs of Lyon following the police killing of terrorist Khaled Kelkal, a key organizer of the 1995 France bombings
 1997: Rioting occurred in Dammarie-lès-Lys after 16-year-old Abdelkadher Bouziane was shot and killed by police and his 19-year-old friend wounded.
 1998: Two days of riots occurred in suburban Toulouse after 17-year-old Habib Muhammed was shot by police during a car theft.

21st century
 2005: 2005 French riots, a series of riots that occurred in the suburbs of Paris and other French cities involving the burning of cars and public buildings at night.
 2006: 2006 youth protests in France, riots resulting from opposition to a measure set to deregulate labour in France.
 2007: 2007 Villiers-le-Bel riots, riots in the Val-d'Oise department that began following the deaths of two teenagers whose motorcycle collided with a police vehicle.
 2007–09: 2007–09 university protests in France, protest movements resulting from several reform projects under Minister for Higher Education and Research Valérie Pécresse.
 2009: 2009 French riots,  a series of riots that occurred on Bastille Day (14 July) in the commune of Montreuil, an eastern suburb area of Paris.
 2012: Notre Dame-des Landes Communities from nearby towns prevent an airport from being built on Notre Dame-des Landes forest and agricultural fields.
 2013: 2013 Trappes riots, riots that broke out after police arrested a man who assaulted a police officer who tried to check the identity of his wife wearing a Muslim veil
 2014: 2014 Sarcelles riots, a pro-Palestinian protest against the Israeli ground invasion of Gaza degenerated into an antisemitic riot in Sarcelles, France.
 2016: 2016 French taxi driver strike, a strike by taxi drivers in several major cities against Uber, included many road blockades, fires, overturned vehicles, and the blockade of roads leading to the two major airports in Paris.
 2016: Nuit debout, protests that grew out of opposition to proposed labor reforms.
 2017: Protests started following accusations a police officer anally raped a young black man with a baton. Anti-police protests continued well into March 2017 when migrants were met with resistance from Paris residents.
 2017: During May Day protests in Paris, a group of about 150 hooded demonstrators disrupted the march, throwing "Molotov cocktails, firebombs and other objects at the police near Place de la Bastille." These "violent protesters, who did not carry any union or election paraphernalia, appeared to be from the same fringe groups that have targeted anti-government protests in the past." Riot police responded with batons and tear gas. Six police officers were injured, two of them seriously, by petrol bombs.
 2018: Ongoing Yellow vests movement (French: Gilets jaunes protests) over dissatisfaction with wealth disparity and ongoing increases to fuel taxes.
 2022: 2022 Corsica unrest by Corsican nationalists in response to prison attack on Yvan Colonna
 2022: 2022 Paris shooting, protests after the killing of three Kurds in Paris. 
 2023: 2023 French pension reform strikes due to the planned raise in retirement age from 62 to 64 years old.

See also
 List of riots
 List of incidents of civil unrest in the United States

References

 
Incidents of civil unrest